Battle of the Five Armies is a 1975 board wargame published by LORE / JMJ Enterprises and by TSR later.

Gameplay
Battle of the Five Armies is a game that simulates the Battle of Five Armies.

Publication history
According to Shannon Appelcline, in 1975 TSR "started distributing other publishers' games — a pretty common tactic at the time, as the hobbyist industry was pretty fractured. They advertised their first distributed items in The Strategic Review #3 (Autumn 1975): a set of three fantasy board games. To be precise, they were three fantasy board games based on the writings of J.R.R. Tolkien: Fact and Fantasy's The Battle of Helm's Deep (1974), Fact and Fantasy's The Siege of Minas Tirith (1975), and LORE's Battle of the Five Armies (1975)."

Reception
Larry Pound reviewed The Battle of the Five Armies in The Space Gamer No. 3. Pound commented that "All in all, the game [is] fair, but the total impression is not enhanced by the colors used for the unit counters or the way the terrain features are drawn."

Martin Easterbrook reviewed the TSR version of Battle of the Five Armies for White Dwarf #3, giving it an overall rating of 5 out of 10, and stated that "The game's main strength is that it does possess something of the atmosphere of the book. The inexorably slow advancing sea of goblin warriors becomes quite hypnotic after a while and you really do begin bitting your fingernails whilst praying for the arrival of the eagles and Beorn."

2005 Version
In 2005, Games Workshop released a Battle of Five Armies tabletop wargame, designed by Rick Priestley using highly detailed 10 mm figures sculpted by Mark Harrison, based on Games Workshop's Warmaster rules.

2014 Edition
The Battle of Five Armies is a standalone game produced by Ares Games based on the rules for War of the Ring (board game), but with the rules modified to function on a tactical level as they describe a smaller battle rather than the entire war.

References

Board games introduced in 1975